Mysteries Decoded is an American television documentary series that premiered on January 10, 2019 on The CW. The show is hosted by Jennifer Marshall, a United States Navy veteran turned private investigator.

In 2020, it aired updated versions of some of its episodes featuring new interviews. On April 7, 2022, the series was renewed for a second season which premiered on July 6, 2022. The third season is scheduled to premiere on April 2, 2023.

Episodes

Series overview

Season 1 (2019)

Season 1 Updates (2020)

Season 2 (2022)

Special (2022)

Ratings

Season 1

Season 1 Updates

Season 2

Special

References

External links

2010s American documentary television series
2019 American television series debuts
2020s American documentary television series
The CW original programming
English-language television shows
Television series about conspiracy theories